Chains of the Sea is a 1973 anthology of three science-fiction novellas:   "And Us, Too, I Guess" by  George Alec Effinger,  "Chains of the Sea" by Gardner Dozois, and "The Shrine of Sebastian" by Gordon Eklund, edited and with an introduction by  Robert Silverberg.

Contents
 And Us, too, I Guess

 Chains of the Sea

Alien ships land in Delaware, Ohio, Colorado, and Venezuela, where their landing catches the attention of human-created Artificial Intelligence (AI) and the military.  An initial attack on an alien ship yields no results, and governments unsuccessfully attempt to cover-up news of the landings.  AI succeeds in communicating with the Aliens, though it does not share this fact with the humans.   The Aliens, who exhibit little interest in humans,  reveal to AI that Earth is ruled not by humans nor AI, but rather by previously unknown races of non-human intelligences.  Meanwhile, a young boy named Tommy has the unique ability to see otherwise-invisible inhabitants of Earth.  He  visits a forest inhabited by The Other People where he glimpses entities called Jeblings  and communicates with beings called Thants.  The Thants inform him of the alien's landing.   As a result, Tommy is diagnosed as hyperactive and placed on medication.

Dozois's "Chains of the Sea" was nominated for the Hugo Award for Best Novella and the Nebula Award for Best Novella.   The novella earned a mention in the Acknowledgements section of  Michael Swanwick's Nebula-Award-winning novel Stations of the Tide.  "Chains of the Sea" was noted in the Encyclopedia of Science Fiction for its alien invasion where the aliens "are more or less indifferent to the existence of humans".

 The Shrine of Sebastian

References

Science fiction anthologies
1973 anthologies